Volodymyr Ivanovych Dudarenko (6 February 1946 – 18 May 2017) was a Ukrainian and Soviet football player and coach.

Volodymyr Dudarenko was born in the city of Rivne, Ukrainian SSR right after World War II.

He died on 18 May 2017.

Honours 
Soviet Top League
Champion with CSKA Moscow: 1970.

International career
Dudarenko made his debut for USSR on 19 February 1971 in a friendly against Mexico. Later the same year he played his other game with the El Salvador national football team.

References

External links
  After scoring the army team I became a soldier (interview by the newspaper "Vysoky Zamok")
  Profile on the Russian national team site

1946 births
2017 deaths
Sportspeople from Rivne
Soviet footballers
Ukrainian footballers
Soviet Union international footballers
Soviet Top League players
PFC CSKA Moscow players
NK Veres Rivne players
Soviet football managers
Ukrainian football managers
SKA Lviv managers
Association football forwards